Acer palmatum, commonly known as Japanese maple, palmate maple, or smooth Japanese maple (Japanese: irohamomiji, or momiji, (栴), is a species of woody plant native to Japan, Korea, China, eastern Mongolia, and southeast Russia. Many different cultivars of this maple have been selected and they are grown worldwide for their large variety of attractive forms, leaf shapes, and spectacular colors.

Description 
It may have multiple trunks joining close to the ground. In habit, its canopy often takes on a dome-like form, especially when mature. The flowers are produced in small cymes, the individual flowers with five red or purple sepals and five whitish petals. The seeds of Acer palmatum and similar species require stratification in order to germinate.

Even in nature, Acer palmatum displays considerable genetic variation, with seedlings from the same parent tree typically showing differences in such traits as leaf size, shape, and color.  The overall form of the tree can vary from upright to weeping.

Three subspecies are recognised:
Acer palmatum subsp. palmatum. Lower altitudes throughout central and southern Japan (not Hokkaido).
Acer palmatum subsp. amoenum . Higher altitudes throughout Japan and South Korea.
Acer palmatum subsp. matsumurae . Higher altitudes throughout Japan.

Cultivation and uses

Acer palmatum has been cultivated in Japan for centuries and in temperate areas around the world since the 1800s. The first specimen of the tree reached Britain in 1821.

When Swedish doctor-botanist Carl Peter Thunberg traveled in Japan late in the eighteenth century, he produced drawings of a small tree that would eventually become synonymous with the high art of oriental gardens. He gave it the species name palmatum after the hand-like shape of its leaves, similar to the centuries-old Japanese names kaede and momiji, references to the 'hands' of frogs and babies, respectively.

Japanese horticulturalists have long developed cultivars from maples found in Japan and nearby Korea and China. They are a popular choice for bonsai enthusiasts and have long been a subject in art.

Numerous cultivars are popular in Europe and North America, with red-leafed favored, followed by cascading green shrubs with deeply dissected leaves.

Acer palmatum includes thousands of named cultivars with a variety of forms, colors, leaf types, sizes, and preferred growing conditions. Heights of mature specimens range from 0.5 to 25 m (1 1⁄2 to 82 ft), depending on type.

Preparations from the branches and leaves are used as a treatment in traditional Chinese medicine.

Growing conditions

In their natural habitat, they grow in the understory; most cultivars prefer part shade, especially in hotter climates, but they will also grow in heavy shade. Some cultivars will tolerate full sun, more so at higher latitudes and less at lower latitudes; red, purple-red, black-red, bronze, and some dark green cultivars are generally more full sun tolerant.  Variegated white, cream, yellow, yellow-orange, or light green cultivars mostly require shade protection.  Almost all are adaptable and blend well with companion plants. The trees are particularly suitable for borders and ornamental paths because the root systems are compact and not invasive.  Many varieties of Acer palmatum are successfully grown in containers.  Trees are prone to die during periods of drought and prefer consistent water conditions; more established trees are less prone to drought.  They benefit from being mulched yearly with a 2" layer of aged organic matter mulch, covering at least beyond the entire drip-line of the tree, but not allowed to touch the bark at the base of the tree.  Moderate to well-drained soil is essential as they will not survive in poorly drained waterlogged soil. Trees do not require or appreciate heavy fertilization and should only be very lightly fertilized, preferably using polymer-coated slow-release fertilizer with a 3 to 1 ratio of nitrogen to phosphorus respectively, or preferably a bio-solid based fertilizer like a 6-4-0 N-P-K.  High Nitrogen lawn fertilizer should be avoided in the immediate vicinity of these trees, as excessive nitrogen can cause overly vigorous growth that is not consistent with the natural form of the tree, and is prone to dieback and pathogens.

Japanese maples are best to grow in hardiness zones 5-8.

Pruning

If space is not a constraint, no pruning is necessary except to remove any dead branches.  Trees naturally self-prune foliage that doesn't receive enough light, such as internal branches which are overly shaded by its own canopy.  Some growers prefer to shape their trees artistically or to thin out interior branches to better expose the graceful main branches. The form of the tree, especially without leaves in winter, can be of great interest and can be pruned to highlight this feature.  Trees heal readily after pruning without needing aftercare.  This species should not be pruned like a hedge, but instead methodically shaped by carefully choosing individual branches to remove.  They can also be pruned just to maintain a smaller size to suit a particular location.  Acer palmatum can also be used as espalier.

Cultivars

Over 1,000 cultivars have been chosen for particular characteristics, which are propagated by asexual reproduction most often by grafting, but some cultivars can also be propagated by budding, cuttings, tissue culture, or layering. Some cultivars are not in cultivation in the Western world or have been lost over the generations, but many new cultivars are developed each decade. Cultivars are chosen for phenotypical aspects such as leaf shape and size (shallowly to deeply lobed, some also palmately compound), leaf color (ranging from chartreuse through dark green or from orange to red, to dark purple, others variegated with various patterns of white and pink), bark texture and color, and growth pattern. Most cultivars are less vigorous and smaller than is typical for the species, but are more interesting than the relatively mundane species.  Cultivars come in a large variety of forms including upright, broom, vase, umbrella, weeping, cascading, dwarf, shrub, and ground cover.  Most cultivars are artificially selected from seedlings of open-pollinated plants, purposeful breeding is not common, and less often from grafts of witch's brooms.

In Japan, iromomiji is used as an accent tree in Japanese gardens, providing gentle shade next to the house in the summer and beautiful colors in autumn. Many cultivars have characteristics that come into prominence during different seasons, including the color of new or mature leaves, extraordinary autumn color, color and shape of samaras, or even bark that becomes more brightly colored during the winter. Some cultivars can scarcely be distinguished from others unless labeled. In some cases, identical cultivars go by different names, while in other cases, different cultivars may be given the same name.

Popular cultivars
A selection of notable or popular cultivars, with brief notes about characteristics that apply during at least one season, includes the following.
 indicates the cultivar has gained the Royal Horticultural Society's Award of Garden Merit.

'Aka shigitatsu sawa'; pinkish-white leaves with green veins
'Ao ba jo'; a dwarf with bronze-green summer foliage

'Atropurpureum' ; wine-red, including new branches (see 'Dissectum Atropurpureum'); original cultivar lost and diluted by use of the name to market seedlings of a similar look.
'Beni-malko' ; 
'Beni-tsukasa' ; 
'Bloodgood' ; ;  a cultivar of 'Atropurpureum', vigorous growth, large size, a classic cultivar, but supplanted by improved similar selections like 'Emperor I' and 'Fireglow'.
'Burgundy Lace' ; 
'Butterfly' ; Small upright tree form for shade, slow growing, small palmate leaves variegated with white borders and a bluish-green tint, pink hues show up during spring and fall.
'Chitose-Yama' ; 
'Crimson Queen' ; (see var. dissectum 'Crimson Queen')
'Dissectum' ; lace-like leaves, drooping habit
'Dissectum Atropurpureum' ;
var. dissectum 'Crimson Queen' ; 
var. dissectum 'Garnet' ; 
var. dissectum 'Inaba-shidare' ; 
var. dissectum 'Seiryu' ;  a green, tree-like shrub with finely dissected leaves
'Elegans' ; 
'Emperor 1' ; One of the best red amoenums, similar to 'Bloodgood', but slightly smaller size, holds a deep red color even in shade and summer heat.
'Garnet' ; (see var. dissectum 'Garnet')
'Golden Pond' ; greenish-yellow summer foliage
'Goshiki koto hime' ; a delicate, variegated dwarf
'Higasa yama' ; crinkled leaves variegated with yellow
'Hogyuko' ; rich green leaves, turning orange in autumn
'Hupp's Dwarf' ; a small, dense shrub with miniature leaves
'Inaba-shidare' ; (see var. dissectum 'Inaba-shidare')
'Issai nishiki kawazu' ; very rough, rigid bark
'Jerre Schwartz' ; dwarf variety, toothed, deeply lobed, mid-dark green leaves, flushed pink and then bronze-green in spring, turning red in autumn.
'Kagiri nishiki' ; similar to 'Butterfly' but more pinkish tones
'Karasu gawa' ; slow-growing variegate with brilliant pink and white
'Katsura' ;  yellow-green leaves tipped with orange
'Koto no ito' ; light green, thread-like leaves
'Little Princess' ; a sparsely branched dwarf with irregular habit
'Mama' ; a bushy dwarf with extremely variable foliage
'Masu murasaki' ; a shrubby tree with purple leaves
'Mizu kuguri' ; orange-tinted new growth and very wide habit
'Nigrum' ; deep purple leaves turning to crimson
'Nishiki gawa' ; pinetree-like bark desirable for bonsai
'Nomura nishiki' ;  dark purple, lace-like leaves
'Ojishi' ;  tiny dwarf, grows only a few centimetres per year
'Orange Dream' ; <ref>{{cite web|url=https://www.rhs.org.uk/Plants/60709/Acer-palmatum-Orange-Dream-(P)/Details |title=Acer palmatum 'Orange Dream' (P) |publisher=Royal Horticultural Society |access-date=6 April 2017}}</ref> an ssp. palmatum cultivar, with small leaves yellow with orange in spring, green in summer, orange-yellow in autumn. Bark bright green
'Orangeola' ; An excellent cultivar of the weeping shrub form, prized for its dynamic color which changes constantly throughout the season.  
'Ornatum' ; 
'Peaches and Cream' ; similar to 'Aka shigitatsu sawa'
'Pink Filigree' ; finely dissected, brownish-pink leaves
'Pung kil' ; Improved selection of the 'linearlobum' types; thin-lobed purple-red leaves, good color retention. Even the new growth displays the linearlobum type leaf form.
'Red Dragon' ; One of the finest of the lace-leaf weeping umbrella-shaped forms. Similar to 'Crimson Queen', but smaller overall size and with better red color retention into the summer heat.
'Red Filigree Lace' ; Dwarf sized umbrella-shaped weeping form, extra finely dissected delicate dark purple leaves, slow growth rate.
'Red Pygmy' ; 
'Sango kaku' ;   Coral-bark maple (formerly 'Senkaki'); with pinkish-red bark
'Seiryu' ; (see var. dissectum 'Seiryu')
'Shaina' ; a dwarf sport from 'Bloodgood'
'Shin deshojo' ; an improved selection of the 'coralinum' type ssp. palmatum cultivars, with a small overall size, small leaves, and a vibrant red spring coloration different from most other red cultivars. One of the best cultivars for bonsai. 
'Shikage ori nishiki' ; vase-shaped shrub with dull purple foliage
'Shishigashira' ; a unique cultivar, notable for its growth habit similar to a puffy cloud or lion's mane, and its crinkled thick leaves.  
'Skeeter's Broom' ; derived from a 'Bloodgood' witch's broom
'Tamukeyama' ; finely dissected, dark purple, cascading habit
'Trompenburg' ;   slender, upright grower, convex lobes, purple leaves
'Tsuma gaki' ; yellow leaves with reddish-purple borders
'Villa Taranto' ; 
'Yuba e' ; upright tree with scarlet variegation

In addition to the cultivars described above, a number of cultivar groups have been naturally selected over time to such an extent that seedlings often resemble the parent. Many of these are sold under the same name as the cultivars, or even propagated by grafting, so there is often much ambiguity in distinguishing them. In particular, a number of dark-red Acer palmatum are sold with the names ‘Atropurpureum’ and ‘Bloodgood’. Many different cultivars with delicate lace-like foliage are sold under names such as ‘Dissectum’, ‘Filigree’ and ‘Laceleaf’.

Similar species
The term "Japanese maple" is also sometimes used to describe other species, usually within the series Palmata, that are similar to A. palmatum and native to China, Korea or Japan, including:Acer duplicatoserratum (syn. A. palmatum var. pubescens Li)Acer japonicum—downy Japanese mapleAcer pseudosieboldianum—Korean mapleAcer shirasawanum—fullmoon mapleAcer sieboldianum—Siebold's mapleAcer buergerianum—trident maple
Given that these maples are phenotypically variable within each species, and may hybridise with one another, distinguishing between them may be a matter of gradient speciation. In commercial propagation, A. palmatum'' is often used as rootstock for many of these other species.

References

External links

RHS: Acer palmatum cultivation
Maple Forum at the UBC Botanical Garden - The defacto place where Japanese Maple Enthusiasts share their interest
photo of herbarium specimen at Missouri Botanical Garden, collected in Japan
Shoot: ''Acer palmatum 'Orange Dream'''

palmatum
Trees of Japan
Trees of China
Trees of Korea
Plants described in 1784
Trees of Taiwan
Ornamental trees
Plants used in bonsai
Garden plants of Asia